Astronidium ligulatum is a species of plant in the family Melastomataceae endemic to French Polynesia.

References

Flora of French Polynesia
ligulatum
Least concern plants
Taxonomy articles created by Polbot